Aleksandr Mikhaylov (born 6 November 1970) is a Russian freestyle skier. He competed at the 1998 Winter Olympics and the 2002 Winter Olympics.

References

1970 births
Living people
Russian male freestyle skiers
Olympic freestyle skiers of Russia
Freestyle skiers at the 1998 Winter Olympics
Freestyle skiers at the 2002 Winter Olympics
Sportspeople from Volgograd